The women's 50m freestyle events at the 2017 World Para Swimming Championships were held in Mexico City between 2–7 December.

Medalists

Results

References

2017 World Para Swimming Championships